Crawfordville is a town in Taliaferro County, Georgia, United States. The population was 534 at the 2010 census. The city is the county seat of Taliaferro County.

History
Crawfordville was founded in 1825 as the seat of the newly formed Taliaferro County. It was incorporated as a town in 1826 and as a city in 1906. The community was named after William H. Crawford (1772–1834), U.S. Secretary of War and Secretary of the Treasury.

Geography
Crawfordville is located at  (33.554626, -82.898428).

Demographics

As of the census of 2000, there were 572 people, 260 households, and 163 families residing in the city. The racial makeup of the city was 41.43% White, 56.99% African American, 1.05% from other races, and 0.52% from two or more races. Hispanic or Latino of any race were 0.52% of the population.

There were 260 households, out of which 25.0% had children under the age of 18 living with them, 32.7% were married couples living together, 26.2% had a female householder with no husband present, and 37.3% were non-families. 35.0% of all households were made up of individuals, and 19.6% had someone living alone who was 65 years of age or older.  The average household size was 2.20 and the average family size was 2.82.

In the city, the population was spread out, with 23.1% under the age of 18, 7.5% from 18 to 24, 24.8% from 25 to 44, 23.1% from 45 to 64, and 21.5% who were 65 years of age or older.  The median age was 42 years. For every 100 females, there were 79.9 males.  For every 100 females age 18 and over, there were 71.9 males.

The median income for a household in the city was $19,063, and the median income for a family was $22,386. Males had a median income of $26,705 versus $23,000 for females. The per capita income for the city was $15,103.  About 28.8% of families and 29.0% of the population were below the poverty line, including 38.3% of those under age 18 and 20.2% of those age 65 or over.

Education

Taliaferro County School District 
The Taliaferro County School District  consists of one charter school offering pre-school to grade twelve. As of 2012, the district had 24 full-time teachers and over 280 students.

Attractions
Crawfordville was the birthplace and home of Alexander H. Stephens, who served as a U.S. Congressman, Governor of Georgia, and most notably as Vice President of the Confederate States of America, 1861–1865.  Stephens' home, Liberty Hall, is preserved as a museum and is a part of the A. H. Stephens Historic Park, a Georgia State Park located in Crawfordville.

Crawfordville is also the birthplace of Michael H. Rhodes, a radio and television personality that worked for Seattle based KING broadcasting during the 1940s–1980s alongside other famous Northwest greats: JP Patches and Stan Boreson.

The movie Sweet Home Alabama was partially filmed in Crawfordville. It includes the historical Taliaferro County Courthouse in one scene, as well as a scene with Reese Witherspoon walking down Main Street.

The movies Coward of the County with Kenny Rogers, Get Low with Robert Duvall, and the 1978 TV movie Summer of My German Soldier were filmed here.

Gallery

See also

Central Savannah River Area

References

External links

 Official Website

Cities in Georgia (U.S. state)
Cities in Taliaferro County, Georgia
County seats in Georgia (U.S. state)
Historic districts on the National Register of Historic Places in Georgia (U.S. state)
National Register of Historic Places in Taliaferro County, Georgia
1825 establishments in Georgia (U.S. state)
Populated places established in 1825